Phonological Analysis: a Functional Approach is a book by Donald A. Burquest designed for an introductory course in phonology.

Reception
The book was reviewed by Daniel L. Everett and Paul D. Fallon

References

External links
Phonological Analysis: a Functional Approach
1993 non-fiction books
Phonology books
Linguistics textbooks
SIL International books